"I'm the One You Need" is a 1992 song by American singer Jody Watley, released as the second single from her third album, Affairs of the Heart.

History
Produced by house music pioneer, David Morales, "I'm the One You Need" constitutes Watley's initial foray into house music (though its "Affairs of the Heart" predecessor, "I Want You", boasted a house version). "I'm the One You Need" was Watley's seventh Top 20 pop single in the US, and sixth Top five dance single, charting at #19 on the Billboard Hot 100, and #6 on the Hot Dance Music/Club Play charts, respectively.

Significance
"I'm the One You Need" is often credited with introducing DJ David Morales' then-darker sound to the worldwide remixing community. Indeed, British DJ, John Digweed re-edited  the Morales' “Dead Zone” version of the song for its inclusion on his [Digweed] edition of the Azuli Records compilation, Choice - A Collection of classics, and cited it as an influence on the UK DJing community in the compilation's liner notes:

Official remixes
Radio Edit
David Morales Extended Club Version
Def Dub Version
Driza Bone 7-inch Edit
Driza Bone 12-inch Mix
Driza Bone Funky Chicken Version

Charts

Weekly charts

Year-end charts

References

Jody Watley songs
1992 singles
House music songs
Songs written by Jody Watley
Songs written by David Morales
1991 songs
MCA Records singles